Ko Ping-chung (also Ko Pin-chung , born 18 September 1995) is a Taiwanese 9-ball pool player. Ko is the younger brother of Ko Pin-yi.

Career
In November 2010, Ko Ping-chung reached his first major final the All Japan Championship. However, he lost in the final against the German Thorsten Hohmann. In May 2011, he reached the knockout round of a men's world championship for the first time at the 2011 WPA World Ten-ball Championship and lost in the last 64 match against Darren Appleton 8–9. At the 2011 WPA World Nine-ball Championship he would lose in the preliminary round. In November 2013, he managed to win 8–5 in the final against Poland  to become Junior World 9-ball Champion.

At the 2014 WPA World Nine-ball Championship Ko Ping-chung lost in the preliminary round. One month later he finished second in the CSI U.S. Open 10-Ball Championship and won the CSI U.S Open 8-Ball Championship in the final against Shane Van Boening.  In February 2015, Ko reached the semi-finals of the 2015 WPA World Ten-ball Championship, where he played his brother Ko Pin-yi, who would eventually win the event. At the 2015 WPA World Nine-ball Championship he also reached the semifinals but was defeated by Shane Van Boening 1–11. In November 2015, he made the final at the Steinway Classic, but he lost to his compatriot Chang Yu-lung. In the 2016 WPA World Nine-ball Championship he lost in the quarterfinals 10–11 against Alex Pagulayan.

In July 2019, Ko won the 2019 WPA World Ten-ball Championship, defeating Joshua Filler 10–7 in the final. Later that year, he reached the semi-finals of the 2019 WPA World Nine-ball Championship, losing to eventual champion Fedor Gorst.

Titles
 2019 Asian 9-Ball Championship
 2019 WPA World Ten-ball Championship
 2014 CSI U.S Open 8-Ball Championship
 2013 WPA World Nine-ball Junior championship

References

External links 

Taiwanese pool players
1995 births
Living people
WPA World Ten-ball Champions
Medalists at the 2017 Summer Universiade